Evonne Goolagong defeated the defending champion Margaret Court in the final, 6–4, 6–1 to win the ladies' singles tennis title at the 1971 Wimbledon Championships. It was her second major title.

Seeds

  Margaret Court (final)
  Billie Jean King (semifinals)
  Evonne Goolagong (champion)
  Rosie Casals (second round)
  Virginia Wade (fourth round)
  Nancy Richey (quarterfinals)
  Françoise Dürr (quarterfinals)
  Helga Masthoff (third round)

Qualifying

Draw

Finals

Top half

Section 1

Section 2

Section 3

Section 4

Bottom half

Section 5

Section 6

Section 7

Section 8

References

External links

1971 Wimbledon Championships – Women's draws and results at the International Tennis Federation

Women's Singles
Wimbledon Championship by year – Women's singles
Wimbledon Championships
Wimbledon Championships